Gaveet Nirmala Ramesh is an Indian politician from Maharashtra. She is a two-term member of the Maharashtra Legislative Assembly.

Constituency
Gaveet Nirmala Ramesh was elected from the Igatpuri assembly constituency Maharashtra.

Political Party 
She is a member of the Indian National Congress.

Positions held 
Maharashtra Legislative Assembly MLA
Terms in office: 2009-2014 and 2014–2019.

References

Living people
Maharashtra MLAs 2014–2019
Indian National Congress politicians
Maharashtra MLAs 2009–2014
Marathi politicians
Year of birth missing (living people)
Indian National Congress politicians from Maharashtra